Mūša (German: Muhsse) is a river in Northern Lithuania and Southern Latvia (Zemgale region). At its confluence with the river Nemunėlis in Latvia, near city Bauska, the river Lielupė is formed. The river is 164 kilometers (146 km in Lithuania, 18 km in Latvia) long.

References
 LIETUVOS RESPUBLIKOS UPIŲ IR TVENKINIŲ KLASIFIKATORIUS (Republic of Lithuania- River and Pond Classifications).  Ministry of Environment (Lithuania). Accessed 2011-11-17.

Rivers of Lithuania
Rivers of Latvia
International rivers of Europe
Latvia–Lithuania border